Robillardia is a genus of very small ectoparasitic sea snails, marine gastropod mollusks or micromollusks in   the Eulimidae family. This genus was described by Edgar Albert Smith in 1889.

Species
Species within the genera Robillardia include:

Robillardia cernica E. A. Smith, 1889 (Type taxon)
Robillardia pisum Habe, 1953
Robillardia solida Warén, 1980

References

External links 

Marine Species Identification Portal

Eulimidae